The 2008 CAA men's basketball tournament was an NCAA Division 1 College Basketball Conference tournament that was held at the Richmond Coliseum on March 7–10, 2008, to decide the Colonial Athletic Association conference champion. The winner advances to the NCAA Men's Division I Basketball Championship tournament, a 64-team tournament to decide a national champion of college basketball.

Bracket

Honors

Notable games

First round 
 William and Mary d. Georgia State 58–57: David Schneider made a 3-pointer with less than a second remaining to eliminate the Panthers one year after the Tribe lost to GSU the same way.

Quarterfinals
 George Mason d. Northeastern 63–52: One week prior to this game, Northeastern had beaten GMU in the regular season finale.

Semifinals
 William and Mary d. VCU 56–54: Laimus Kisielius banked in a layup with 3 seconds left to earn W&M its first-ever trip to the CAA Championship game. The fans stormed the Richmond Coliseum court.

Championship
 George Mason d. William and Mary 68–59: The win secured GMU coach Jim Larranaga's fourth NCAA Tournament appearance with the Patriots since 1998.

References

Tournament
Colonial Athletic Association men's basketball tournament
CAA men's basketball tournament
CAA men's basketball tournament
Sports competitions in Virginia
Basketball in Virginia